The Boxing Tournament at the 1970 Asian Games was held in Bangkok, Thailand from 10 December 1970 to 15 December 1970 with South Korea topping the medal table with six gold medals.

Medalists

Medal table

References
Amateur Boxing

External links
 OCA official website

 
1970 Asian Games events
1970
Asian Games
1970 Asian Games